Hand Hills is a range of hills in Alberta, Canada.

Hand Hills recalls an Indian chief who possessed an unusually small hand.

References

Mountains of Alberta